Londyńczycy (English: "The Londoners") is a Polish TV drama series about Polish immigrants in London, aired on TVP 1 since late 2008. It is currently aired on Community Channel.

The title music for the series is Robbie Williams song "Supreme".

Cast

Other roles 
Selva Rasalingam as Zayed Rampal
Marcin Tyrol as Roman
Małgorzata Buczkowska as Wiola
James Doherty as Alvin Fox
Dominic Cazenove as Peter
Maja Bohosiewicz as Kinga
Janusz Chabior	as Jacek
Michał Czernecki as Robal
Przemyslaw Redkowski as Worker
Nadia Aldridge	as Kate
Allan Hale as Miguel Ribeiro
Sławomir Orzechowski as Wiesio
Ryan Hurst as James Dyer
Marcin Juchniewicz as Russian Man
Dariusz Juzyszyn as Misza
Nicholas Kipriano as Ali
David Price as John Brown
Julia Balsewicz as Iza
Sylwia Juszczak as Justyna
Weronika Rosati as Weronika Fox
Fionnuala Ellwood as Annabelle
David Broughton-Davies	
Maurice Byrne as Actor Edward Watson
Zbigniew Borek	as Budzisz (Asia's father)
Michał Sitarski as Tomasz Skowronek
Piotr Borowski	as Rumun
Oliver Gilbert	as John (teacher)
Joanna Hole as Janis
Grzegorz Jurkiewicz
Patricia Kazadi as Recepcionist Helen Hobbs
Zbigniew Konopka as Worker
Mehdi Rezvan as Hamid
Rakel Dimar as Mary
Zygmunt Malanowicz as Władek
Anita Wright as Emily
Weronika Książkiewicz as Agnieszka
 Kacper Kowalski as Willy
 Aleksandra Konieczna as Basia
 Katarzyna Figura as Elizabeth
 Rui Carlos Ferreira as Edilson Ribeiro
 Gareth Llewelyn as Steven
 Philip Michael as Jamal
 Nathan Lewis as Tanzan
 Victor Perel as Lifesaver
 Harry Napier as Brian

Personnel 
Director: Greg Zglinski
Script: Ewa Popiołek, Marek Kreutz
Photos: Tomasz Dobrowolski
Scenography: Jacek Turewicz
Costumes: Dominika Gebel
Montage: Maciej Pawlicki, Leszek Starzyński
Production: Telewizja Polska S.A.
TVP producer: Dorota Kośmicka
Editorial TVP: Krzysztof Gostkowski
Executive producer: Telemark sp. z o.o.
Leading manufacturer: Anna Kępińska-Andryszczak
Co-production: STI Studio Filmowe
Production manager: Mirosław Warchoł

International broadcasters 
Finland: Yle Teema, November 27, 2012.
Sweden: SVT2, 2010.

External links 
 Londyńczycy homepage at tvp.pl
 

Polish television soap operas
Television shows set in London

Works about human migration